Finnieston distillery is one of the thirty-three lost distilleries in the City of Glasgow, Scotland. The Finnieston Distillery was formed on the lands of Stobcross, at that time held by John Orr of Barrowfield, who named it after Mr Finnie, who was a tutor in his family.

Foundation
The Finnieston Distillery was founded in 1824 by Ebenezer Connal, on Finnieston Street in the City of Glasgow, Scotland.

Ingredients
Like many of the distillers of his time Ebenezer was known to add ingredients to the whisky to enhance the whisky's flavour. 
He encouraged mixing the whisky with herbs and heathers to make the drinking experience as enjoyable as possible.

Closure
Operations were suspended in 1827 and the distillery was demolished.

References 

Udo, Misako (2006). "The Scottish Whisky Distilleries: For the Whisky Enthusiast"

External links
Lowland Whisky Distilleries 
Lost Distilleries of the Lowlands

Distilleries in Scotland